The New England Intercollegiate Sailing Association (NEISA) is one of the seven conferences affiliated with the Inter-Collegiate Sailing Association (ICSA) that schedule and administer regattas within their established geographic regions.

NEISA is one of the oldest and largest conferences, organizing intercollegiate sailing in New England, which includes 42 member schools including club teams and varsity programs. All conferences host their own 6 conference championships every year and gain berths to the corresponding national championships based on conference size. NEISA is managed by an executive board run primarily by student volunteers and team coaches.

History 
The New England Intercollegiate Sailing Association was founded in Cambridge, Massachusetts on March 26, 1949. This group of initially 21 teams joined with the Middle Atlantic Intercollegiate Sailing Association, and later the Midwest College Sailing Association and Pacific Coast Intercollegiate Yacht Racing Association to form the Intercollegiate Yacht Racing Association of North America. This Association worked to standardize rules and create entry and eligibility regulations, as well as broaden the scope of its competitions.
From the beginning of college sailing, all regattas have been sailed in the host school's fleet of boats. Early on there was little consistency in the type of boat across different parts of the country and even between neighboring schools. Over time however, many schools have transitioned from various single-sail dinghies to use more durable and faster two-sail boats such as the FJ and Club 420.

Members

Leadership 
NEISA is a largely run and regulated by in-conference coaches and sailors. Members of the Executive Committee are elected annually at the NEISA Annual Meeting held late Fall. There is currently no term-limit for Executive Committee members. As of Spring, 2019 the Executive Committee was as follows.

Championships 
NEISA runs and hosts six in-conference championships, as well as sends teams to national championship events managed by the Inter-Collegiate Sailing Association.

In-conference Championships 
For Coed teams, these in-conference championships include:

 Coed Dinghy Fleet Racing, NEISA Coed Championship/ US Coast Guard Alumni Bowl
 Men's Single-Handed Fleet Racing, NEISA Men's Singlehanded Championships
 Coed Team Racing, New England Team Race Championship/ Fowle Trophy
 Coed Match Racing, NEISA Match Race Champs/ Larry White Trophy

For Women's teams, these in-conference championships include:

 Women's Dinghy Fleet Racing, NEISA Women's Championship/ Reed Trophy
 Women's Single-Handed Fleet Racing, NEISA Women's Singlehanded Championships

National Championships 
For full article on national sailing championships, see Inter-Collegiate Sailing Association National Championships

The number of berths NEISA teams are given to national championships depend on the event and are determined by ICSA at the beginning of every Year. As NEISA is one of the largest conferences, it is annually given more berths than the smaller conferences. The representing teams from NEISA are determined by the corresponding In-Conference Championships.

These national championships include:
 Coed Dinghy Fleet Racing, Gill Coed National Championships/ Henry A. Morss Memorial Trophy
 Men's Single-Handed Fleet Racing, Laser Performance Men's Singlehanded Nationals/Glen S. Foster Trophy
 Coed Team Racing, LaserPerformance Team Race National Championship/ Walter Cromwell Wood Bowl
 Coed Match Racing, ICSA Match Race Nationals/ Cornelius Shields Sr. Trophy
 Women's Dinghy Fleet Racing, Sperry Women's National Championship/ Gerald C. Miller Trophy
 Women's Single-Handed Fleet Racing, Laser Performance Women's Singlehanded Nationals/ Janet Lutz Trophy

Results and Rankings 
Since 2008, Inter-collegiate racing results are documented using College Sailing Techscore, a website which records live race results for current regattas, as well as documents past seasons. NEISA also creates in-conference team rankings every Fall based on the best regatta results of each team and the relative difficulty/ size of the regattas those results came from. A team's score is calculated by summing their top 5 scoring regattas and also their score at the New England Fall Championships. These scores are compiled to rank all participating teams. Teams that are not listed on the rankings did not sail a scored regatta during that Season.

References

ICSA conferences